The unified theory of acceptance and use of technology (UTAUT) is a technology acceptance model formulated by Venkatesh and others in "User acceptance of information technology: Toward a unified view". The UTAUT aims to explain user intentions to use an information system and subsequent usage behavior. The theory holds that there are four key constructs: 
1) performance expectancy, 
2) effort expectancy, 
3) social influence, and 
4) enabling conditions.

The first three are direct determinants of usage intention and behavior, and the fourth is a direct determinant of user behavior. Gender, age, experience, and voluntariness of use are posited to moderate the impact of the four key constructs on usage intention and behavior. The theory was developed through a review and consolidation of the constructs of eight models that earlier research had employed to explain information systems usage behaviour (theory of reasoned action, technology acceptance model, motivational model, theory of planned behavior, a combined theory of planned behavior/technology acceptance model, model of personal computer use, diffusion of innovations theory, and social cognitive theory). Subsequent validation by Venkatesh et al. (2003) of UTAUT in a longitudinal study found it to account for 70% of the variance in Behavioural Intention to Use (BI) and about 50% in actual use.

Application
 Koivumäki et al. applied UTAUT to study the perceptions of 243 individuals in northern Finland toward mobile services and technology and found that time spent using the devices did not affect consumer perceptions, but familiarity with the devices and user skills did have an impact.
 Eckhardt et al. applied UTAUT to study social influence of workplace referent groups (superiors, colleagues) on intention to adopt technology in 152 German companies and found significant impact of social influence from workplace referents on information technology adoption.
 Curtis et al. applied UTAUT to the adoption of social media by 409 United States nonprofit organizations.  UTAUT had not been previously applied to the use of social media in public relations.  They found that organizations with defined public relations departments are more likely to adopt social media technologies and use them to achieve their organizational goals.  Women considered social media to be beneficial, and men exhibited more confidence in actively utilizing social media.
 Verhoeven et al. applied UTAUT to study computer use frequency in 714 university freshmen in Belgium and found that UTAUT was also useful in explaining varying frequencies of computer use and differences in information and communication technology skills in secondary school and in the university.
 Welch et al. applied UTAUT to study factors contributing to Mobile learning adoption among 118 museum staff in England.  UTAUT had not been previously applied to the use of just-in-time knowledge interventions to development technological knowledge within the museum sector.  They found that UTAUT was useful in explaining the determinants of mobile learning adoption.

Extension of the theory
 Lin and Anol postulated an extended model of UTAUT, including the influence of online social support on network information technology usage.  They surveyed 317 undergraduate students in Taiwan regarding their online social support in using instant messaging and found that social influence plays an important role in affecting online social support.
 Sykes et al. proposed a model of acceptance with peer support (MAPS), integrating prior research on individual adoption with research on social networks in organizations. They conducted a 3-month-long study of 87 employees in one organization and found that studying social network constructs can aid in understanding new information system use.
 Wang, Wu, and Wang added two constructs (perceived playfulness and self-management of learning) to the UTAUT in their study of determinants of acceptance of mobile learning in 370 individuals in Taiwan and found that they were significant determinants of behavioral intention to use mobile learning in all respondents.
 Hewitt et al. extended the UTAUT to study the acceptance of autonomous vehicles. Two separate surveys of 57 and 187 individuals in the USA showed that users were less accepting of high autonomy levels and displayed significantly lower intention to use highly autonomous vehicles.
 Wang and Wang extended the UTAUT in their study of 343 individuals in Taiwan to determine gender differences in mobile Internet acceptance.  They added three constructs – perceived playfulness, perceived value, and palm-sized computer self-efficacy to UTAUT and chose behavioral intention as a dependent variable.  They omitted use behavior, facilitating conditions, and experience.  .l. Also, since the devices were used in a voluntary context, and they found that most adopters were ages 20–35, they omitted voluntariness and age.  Perceived value had a significant influence on adoption intention, and palm-sized computer self-efficacy played a critical role in predicting mobile Internet acceptance.  Perceived playfulness, however, did not have a strong influence on behavioral intention, but this may have been due to service or network communication quality issues during the study.
 Cheng-Min Chao developed and empirically tested a model to predict the factors affecting students' behavioral intentions toward using mobile learning (m-learning). The study applied the extended unified theory of acceptance and use of technology (UTAUT) model with the addition of perceived enjoyment, mobile self-efficacy, satisfaction, trust, and perceived risk moderators. The study collected data from 1562 respondents to conduct a cross-sectional study and employed a research model based on multiple technology acceptance theories.
 Cimperman et al. developed an extended UTAUT model to analyze the acceptance rate of home telehealth services among older adults. The extended UTAUT model has six predictors and were empirically tested to be effective when predicting how a certain behaviour influences acceptance rate.

Criticism
 Bagozzi critiqued the model and its subsequent extensions, stating "UTAUT is a well-meaning and thoughtful presentation," but that it presents a model with 41 independent variables for predicting intentions and at least 8 independent variables for predicting behavior," and that it contributed to the study of technology adoption "reaching a stage of chaos."  He proposed instead a unified theory that coheres the "many splinters of knowledge" to explain decision making.
 Van Raaij and Schepers criticized the UTAUT as being less parsimonious than the previous Technology Acceptance Model and TAM2 because its high R2 is only achieved when moderating key relationships with up to four variables.  They also called the grouping and labeling of items and constructs problematic because a variety of disparate items were combined to reflect a single psychometric construct.
 Li suggested that using moderators to artificially achieve high R2 in UTAUT is unnecessary and also impractical for understanding organizational technology adoption, and demonstrated that good predictive power can be achieved even with simple models when proper initial screening procedures are applied. The results provide insights for organizational research design under practical business settings.

See also
 Lazy user model

References

Product management
Technological change
Management cybernetics